The 2021–22 season was the 122nd season in the existence of AFC Ajax and the club's 66th consecutive season in the top flight of Dutch football. In addition to the domestic league, Ajax participated in this season's edition of the KNVB Cup, the UEFA Champions League and the Johan Cruyff Shield.

Players

First-team squad

Players out on loan

Transfers

In

Out

Loans in

Loans out

Pre-season and friendlies

Pre-season

On-season

Post-season

Competitions

Overall record

Eredivisie

League table

Results summary

Results by round

Matches
The league fixtures were announced on 11 June 2021.

KNVB Cup

Johan Cruyff Shield

UEFA Champions League

Group stage

The draw for the group stage was held on 26 August 2021.

Knockout phase

Round of 16

Statistics

Appearances and goals

|-
|colspan="14"|Players sold or loaned out after the start of the season:
|-

Goalscorers

Clean sheets

Disciplinary record

References

External links

AFC Ajax seasons
AFC Ajax
2021–22 UEFA Champions League participants seasons
Dutch football championship-winning seasons